Najm Eldin Abdallah Abdelgabar (born 17 November 1987) is a Sudanese defender who plays for Al-Merreikh in the Sudan Premier League. He is a member of the Sudan national football team. He was brought from Khartoum-3 in December 2009 to Al-Merreikh. He plays as a center back.

References

Living people
Sudanese footballers
Sudan international footballers
Association football defenders
2011 African Nations Championship players
2012 Africa Cup of Nations players
1987 births
Al-Merrikh SC players
Al Khartoum SC players
El Hilal SC El Obeid players
Sudan A' international footballers